Orkhon is a sum (district) of Bulgan Province in northern Mongolia. The former Soviet Army military base area (10 km long from west to east, 2.5 km from north to south) is 6 km southwest of the sum center. In 2009, its population was 3,012.

References 

Districts of Bulgan Province